, née  (born February 22, 1946) is a Japanese figure skating coach and former competitor. She is the 1968 Winter Universiade champion and a two-time (1966, 1967) Japan national champion. She represented Japan twice at the Winter Olympics, in 1964 and 1968. Her best finish at the World Championships was 5th, which she obtained in 1967 and 1968.

After retiring from competition, she became one of the more successful coaches in Japan. She is married to Nobuo Sato, with whom she has a daughter, Yuka Sato. As of 2011, the couple live near Yokohama.

Results

References

External links 
 

1946 births
Living people
Japanese female single skaters
Olympic figure skaters of Japan
Figure skaters at the 1964 Winter Olympics
Figure skaters at the 1968 Winter Olympics
Japanese figure skating coaches
Sportspeople from Osaka
Female sports coaches
Kansai University alumni
Universiade medalists in figure skating
Universiade gold medalists for Japan
Universiade silver medalists for Japan
Competitors at the 1966 Winter Universiade
Competitors at the 1968 Winter Universiade